Movies 24 is a British pay television channel owned by NBCUniversal and operated by Sky Group. It was launched on 26 June 2006 for Sky broadcasting. The channel is popular for showing Hallmark television films, and television shows which were originally available to watch on the Hallmark Channel in Britain, before it was replaced in 2010.

During the Christmas period the channels are rebranded as Christmas 24 and Christmas 24 +.

History
The channel was launched in the United Kingdom on 26 June 2006 on the satellite provider Sky. On 16 October 2006, a timeshift channel Movies 24 + was launched. The channel was previously a 90-minute timeshift channel called More 24.

In September 2007, Movies 24 + introduced a separate daily schedule from Movies 24, showing the same movies but at different times throughout the day. From 1 April 2020, Movies 24 is not available on the BT TV platform.

It was integrated into Sky Media Village from 23rd of February 2022

From 1 April 2022 at 6am the Movies 24 website is no longer in operation

Programming

In Britain, the channel is well known for its seasonal themed programming, such as Autumn, Halloween, at Christmas, Valentine's Day and Mother's Day, which are broadcast throughout the year. Other movies and tv shows featured can focus on other themes such as Westerns.

Much of the programming on Movies 24 includes: 
 Be My Valentine
 Chesapeake Shores
 The Seven Year Hitch
 Letter Never Sent
 Rescuing Madison
 When Duty Calls
 Change of Heart
 Autumn Dreams
 A Kind of Magic
 I Think I Do
 Harvest Moon
 Double Platinum
 The Good Witch

References

External links
 

Movie channels in the United Kingdom
Television channels and stations established in 2006
Universal Networks International
2006 establishments in the United Kingdom